The fifth season of Bad Girls Club is titled Bad Girls Club: Miami and  premiered on August 3, 2010, on Oxygen. This season moved filming from Los Angeles, California to Miami, Florida in an area on North Bay Road, between 41st and 64th streets, which filming began in early 2010.

Production 
Bad Girls Club: Miami was announced on January 21, 2010, while the fourth season was airing. Casting was also announced at the same time with potential applicants submitting video tape submissions plus casting calls taking place in Los Angeles, Atlanta, Buffalo, Oakland, Chicago, and Pittsburgh.

House 

As in previous seasons of the Bad Girls Club, the women live in a mansion that Oxygen provides for them for approximately three months while being filmed by producers who follow their every move. These women must try to navigate around each other's different personalities and lives. Mansions and styles always change with every new season. The mansion used for season 5 was a two-story building with its own entrance, security fence, and parkway, and it was on the Biscayne Bay. Inside the mansion's double doors, there is a small hallway in tropical colors, with red-painted walls, a green carpet, and small potted trees. At the end of the hallway there is a pet terrarium tank with a corn snake, given the name "Oliver" by the girls. Throughout the house, its decorating themes are bright summer colors, tropical colors, and Miami style. Since season 4, the producers have given the girls a chance to express themselves with given items, however, season 5 girls were given replica mannequins of themselves and a wipe board and marker. In the middle of the house, a large Hollywood-themed award adjacent to the stairs holds a ball that says "The World Is Hers". Unique furniture, such as the provided pool table, have Barbie-like dolls on it. The house pool features a small jacuzzi at its end similar to the one in season 4. The small pool beds feature girlie color, such as hot pink, finishes. On the second floor, the girls were given an ocean view beyond the pool outside. Their bedroom walls are either painted red or light green, and they were also given an exercise machine on the balcony, which also became a smoking area for most of the girls. The modern-day kitchen tabletops were made of marble.

In every season of the Bad Girls Club, seven young women enter the mansion on the season premiere. During the show "replacements" enter the house after a girl departs for whatever reason.

Cast 
The season began with seven original bad girls, of which two left voluntarily, two were removed by production, and one was kicked out by another cast member. Three replacement bad girls were introduced in their absences later in the season.

Duration of Cast

Episodes

Notes

References

External links 
 Episodes Season 5 episodes on MSN.com
 Episodes Season 5 episodes on TVGuide.com
 Episodes  Season 5 episodes on  TV.com

2010 American television seasons
Bad Girls Club seasons
Television shows set in Miami